Coastal Bend College (CBC), formerly known as Bee County College (BCC), is a community college that has its main campus in Beeville, Texas, and which operates branch campuses in Alice, Kingsville, and Pleasanton, Texas.

As defined by the Texas Legislature, the official service area of CBC is:
All of Bee, Brooks, Duval, Jim Wells, Karnes, Live Oak, and McMullen Counties,
The Pleasanton Independent School District, located in Atascosa County, and
The Kingsville, Ricardo, and Santa Gertrudis school districts, located within Kleberg County.

About the college
Enrollment in academic, workforce education, and continuing education classes during the fall of 2019 was 4,992. The Beeville campus of CBC serves the educational needs of more than 1,248 students. It is also one of the region's most significant economic contributors.

History
The Bee County Junior College District was created at an election on November 2, 1965. That election resulted from several years of study and work to establish a community college for Bee County. Support was shown in an overwhelming five-to-one majority for the creation of the district. The desire for a community college was demonstrated again on December 7, 1965, when district citizens approved a tax to support BCC, and to issue bonds to build the college.

The board of trustees selected Grady C. Hogue as the first BCC President. BCC opened in September 1967, with 790 students, 24 full-time instructors and 11 part-time teachers.

The board of trustees officially changed the college name from Bee County College to Coastal Bend College effective September 1, 1998. The name change was made because the service area was extended by an act of the Texas Legislature in 1995.

Academic/transfer programs
The campus also offers hundreds of academic courses in 27 concentration areas, relatable to "majors", which are transferable to most four-year institutions.

Occupational and vocational training
Vocational training is offered in occupational programs such as accounting, automotive technology, child development, computer information technology, cosmetology, dental hygiene, drafting and design technology, office management, health information technology, law enforcement and forensic science, oil and gas technology, pharmacy technician, professional business technology, nursing, radiologic technology, and welding.

Dual-credit program
The dual-credit program at CBC enables high-achieving high school students to take a college class and have it count as both high school and college credit.  Dual-credit courses may be taught at the college along with the general college student population, or less commonly taught at the student's high school by high-school teachers qualified to teach at the college level.  The decision to grant or not grant high-school credit for college courses rests solely with each individual high school.

The requirements for dual-credit qualification are somewhat strict; the student must apply and be accepted for admission to the college, must receive official permission from their high-school counselor and principal to register for a course, and a course articulation agreement between the college and the student's high school must be on file for each course enrolled.

Branch campuses
Coastal Bend College has satellite campuses that operate conjunctively with the main campus, rather than independently like some other college systems. These locations offer a fraction of the programs that the main campus does, and students can move and attend classes between different campuses almost effortlessly. Classes taken at any of the four CBC schools appear on the same transcript.

Alice
CBC Alice Campus offers academic-transfer courses and workforce-education programs in accounting, automotive technology, computer information technology, child development, general office management, law enforcement, nursing, professional business technology, and welding technology. This campus has a centrally located library with print, microfilm, video, and electronic resources and staff to provide reference assistance to individuals and classes.

Kingsville
CBC Kingsville Campus offers workforce-education certificates and degree programs in accounting, child development, computer information technology, cosmetology, electronic servicing, general office management, law enforcement, pharmacy technician, professional business technology, and vocational nursing.

Pleasanton

CBC Pleasanton Campus offers academic transfer courses and workforce-education programs in accounting, child development, computer information technology, cosmetology, general office management, nursing, law enforcement, professional business technology, and vocational nursing. This campus has a centrally located library with print, microfilm, video, and electronic resources and part-time staff to provide reference assistance to individuals and classes.

Extracurricular activities

Athletics

In 2006, the college reinstated a portion of its athletics program after years of absence from intramural competition. Coastal Bend College Cougars compete in National Junior College Athletic Association (NJCAA) Region 14 in men's basketball, soccer, and baseball, and women's basketball, softball, and volleyball.

Surrounding area

Bee County was organized in 1858, and Beeville, its county seat, was created in 1860. The City of Beeville was finally incorporated in 1908. Major segments of the economy are farming, ranching, oil, and the Texas Department of Criminal Justice.

References

External links

Coastal Bend College Home Page

Universities and colleges accredited by the Southern Association of Colleges and Schools
Two-year colleges in the United States
Educational institutions established in 1965
Community colleges in Texas
Education in Bee County, Texas
Education in Jim Wells County, Texas
Education in Kleberg County, Texas
Education in Atascosa County, Texas
1965 establishments in Texas
NJCAA athletics